Strmica can refer to:

In Croatia:
 Strmica, Croatia, a village in the Municipality of Knin

In Slovenia:
 Mala Strmica, a settlement in the Municipality of Šmarješke Toplice
 Strmca, Postojna, a settlement in the Municipality of Postojna (known as Strmica until 1994)
 Strmica, Škofja Loka, a settlement in the Municipality of Škofja Loka
 Strmica, Vrhnika, a settlement in the Municipality of Vrhnika
 Velika Strmica, a settlement in the Municipality of Mokronog-Trebelno